Chrysophlegma is a genus of birds in the woodpeckers family Picidae. These species, found in South and Southeast Asia, were all previously assigned to the genus Picus.

Taxonomy
The species now placed in Chrysophlegma were previously assigned to the genus Picus. A molecular phylogenetic study published in 2008 found that the genus Picus, as then defined, formed two separate clades and might not be monophyletic. Three species were therefore moved from Picus into the resurrected genus Chrysophlegma, which had been introduced in 1850 by the English ornithologist John Gould to accommodate the greater yellownape (Chrysophlegma flavinucha). The genus name combines the Classical Greek khrusos meaning "gold" and phlegma meaning "flame" or "fire".

The genus contains 3 species.

References

 
Bird genera